Jin-ho, also spelled Chin-ho, is a Korean unisex given name, predominantly masculine. The meaning differs based on the hanja used to write each syllable of the given name. There are 43 hanja with the reading "jin" and 49 hanja with the reading "ho" on the South Korean government's official list of hanja which may be used in given names. Jin-ho was the eighth-most popular name for baby boys in South Korea in 1960, not in the top ten in 1970, and rose back to seventh place by 1980.

Entertainers
Choi Jin-ho (actor) (born 1968), South Korean actor
Kim Jin-ho (singer) (born 1986), South Korean male singer
Jo Jin-ho (born 1992), member of South Korean boy group Pentagon

Sportspeople
Kim Jin-ho (archer) (born 1961), South Korean female archer
Cho Jin-ho (footballer) (1973–2017), South Korean male football midfielder
Cho Jin-ho (baseball) (born 1975), South Korean male baseball pitcher
Lee Jin-ho (born 1984), South Korean male football forward
Jung Jin-ho (born 1986), South Korean male handball player
Jung Jin-ho (baseball) (born 1988), South Korean male baseball outfielder
Sin Jin-ho (born 1988), South Korean male football midfielder
Choi Jin-ho (footballer) (born 1989), South Korean football player
Jeong Jin-ho (born 1996), South Korean male football midfielder

Others
Choy Jin-ho (born 1948), South Korean male chemist
Hur Jin-ho (born 1963), South Korean male film director
Hong Jin-ho (born 1982), South Korean male professional StarCraft player

See also
List of Korean given names

References

Korean unisex given names